Medea is a figure in Greek mythology.

Medea may also refer to:

Film and television
 Medea (1959 film), a film of Dame Judith Anderson's Stage Play
 Medea (1969 film), a film by Pier Paolo Pasolini
 Medea (1988 film), a film by Lars von Trier
 Médée (2001 film), a French film
 Medea (2017 film), a Costa Rican film
 Medea (2021 film), a Russian film
 Medea (TV serial), a 2005 TV serial by Theo van Gogh

Literature
 Medea: Harlan's World, a 1985 collection of short science-fiction stories by various authors
 Medea (The Icemark Chronicles), a character from The Icemark Chronicles by Stuart Hill
 Medea, a 1996 novel by Christa Wolf
 Medea, a fictional character; see List of Saint Seiya Omega characters

Theatre
 Medea (play), an ancient Greek play by Euripides
 Medea (Seneca), a 1st-century AD play by Seneca the Younger
 Médée, a 1635 play by Pierre Corneille
 Medea (Johnson play) a 1730 play by Charles Johnson
 Medea, a 1761 play by Richard Glover
 Medea, an 1821 play by Franz Grillparzer
 Medea (Anouilh), a 1946 play by Jean Anouilh
 Medea, a 1946 play translated by Robinson Jeffers
 Medea (Fo play), a 1977 play by Dario Fo
 Medea, the Musical, a 1994 musical comedy by John Fisher

Music
 Medea (ballet), music for ballet by Samuel Barber
 Medea (EP), a 2007 EP by Michou
 Medea (Ex Libris album) (2014)
 "Medea", a song by God Is an Astronaut from the album Epitaph
 "Medea", a song by Khoma from The Second Wave
 Medea, a 2004 piece for soprano, clarinet, cello and piano by Guillaume Connesson
 Medea, for three violoncelli, three electric guitars, percussion and electronics, by Dietmar Bonnen

Opera
 Médée (Charpentier), a 1693 opera by Marc-Antoine Charpentier
 Medea (Benda), a 1775 opera by Georg Benda
 Médée (Cherubini), a 1797 opera by Luigi Cherubini
 Medea in Corinto, an 1813 opera by Simon Mayr
 Medea (Pacini), an 1843 opera by Giovanni Pacini
 , an 1851 opera by Saverio Mercadante
 Medea, a 1906 opera by Vincenzo Tommasini
 Médée (Milhaud), a 1939 opera by Darius Milhaud
 Medea, a 1988 opera by Mikis Theodorakis
 Medea (Reimann), a 2010 opera by Aribert Reimann

Places
 Médéa Province, Algeria
 Médéa, the capital city of Médéa Province
 Olympique de Médéa, an association football club
 Medea, Friuli-Venezia Giulia, Italy
 Medea (Thrace) or Kıyıköy, a village in Vize, Kırklareli Province, Turkey
 Medea Dome, a snow dome in Antarctica

Vehicles
 Medea (yacht)
 Medea-class destroyer
 HMS Medea (1778), a 28-gun sixth rate
 French frigate Médée (1778), a 36-gun fifth rate
 HMS M22 or HMS Medea, an M15-class monitor launched in 1915
 SS Medea (1946–1951, a French coastal tanker
 HMAS Medea, an Australian auxiliary minesweeper (1912–1948)
 HMS Medea, a list of ships named HMS Medea

Visual arts
 Medea (Sandys painting), an 1868 painting by Frederick Sandys
 Medea statue (2007), a statue of Medea in Batumi, Georgia
 Medea, an 1870 painting by Anselm Feuerbach

Other uses
 Medea (name)
 212 Medea, an asteroid
 Maternal effect dominant embryonic arrest (Medea), a selfish gene
 MEDEA Collaborative Media Initiative, new media research centre at Malmö University, Sweden
 Measurements of Earth Data for Environmental Analysis, a project of the United States Intelligence Community
 Croton (plant) or Medea, a plant genus
 Medea gene, the Drosophila melanogaster common mediator Smad gene
 Medea, a Fate/stay night character
 Medea complex, a term for parents who murder or otherwise harm their children; see Greek mythology in popular culture#Social science

See also
 Crypt of Medea, a 1984 video game
 Freispruch für Medea, a 1992 opera by Rolf Liebermann
 Jason and Medea (disambiguation)
 Madea, a fictional character created by Tyler Perry
 Medea hypothesis, the hypothesis that life, understood as a superorganism, is suicidal
 Medes, an ancient Iranian people
 Media (disambiguation)